Theodor 'Theo' Redder (born 19 November 1941 in Werl) is a retired German football player. He spent six seasons in the Bundesliga with Borussia Dortmund. He represented Germany in one friendly.

Honours
 UEFA Cup Winners' Cup winner: 1965–66
 Bundesliga runner-up: 1965–66
 DFB-Pokal winner: 1964–65
 DFB-Pokal finalist: 1962–63

References

External links
 

1941 births
Living people
German footballers
Germany international footballers
Borussia Dortmund players
Bundesliga players
Association football defenders
West German footballers
People from Werl
Sportspeople from Arnsberg (region)
Footballers from North Rhine-Westphalia